The following is a list of gods, goddesses and many other divine and semi-divine figures and creatures from ancient Basque mythology.

Deities 
Aide, a minor goddess of wind and air.
Amalur, the goddess of the earth.
Eate, the god of storms, sometimes associated with fire and ice.
Egoi, a minor wind deity, associated with the south wind.
Eki, the goddess of the Sun, the daughter of Amalur.
Ilargi, the goddess of the Moon, also a daughter of Amalur.
Inguma, the malevolent god of dreams and nightmares.
Mari, a mother goddess, and wife of the deity Sugaar.
Orko, the god of thunder.
Sugaar, the god of storms and thunder, and the husband of Mari. He is normally imagined as a dragon or serpent.

Spirits and other figures 

Aatxe, a cave-dwelling spirit who adopts the form of a young red bull, but being a shapeshifter, sometimes takes the shape of a man.
Akerbeltz, demonic spirit in the form of a billy goat.
Basajaun, the wild man of the woods.
Gaizkiñ, an evil spirit that caused disease.
Gaueko, an evil spirit that comes out at night.
Herensuge, a dragon who plays an important role in a few legends.
Iratxoak, Basque imps, which can be helpful or mischievous depending on how well one treats them.
Jean de l'Ours, a man born to a woman and a bear.
Jentilak, giants sometimes portrayed throwing rocks at churches.
Lamiak, nymphs with bird feet that dwell in rivers and springs.
Mairuak, giants who build stone circles.
Odei, nature spirit of thunder and the personification of storm clouds.
Olentzero, a jentil, the Basque equivalent of Santa Claus.
San Martin Txiki, popular Christian trickster figure.
Sorginak, handmaidens and assistants of the goddess Mari.
Tartalo, the Basque equivalent of the Greco-Roman Cyclops.

References

 
Mythological figures
Lists of deities
Mythology-related lists